Tal Cual Es is the fourth studio album by Argentine singer-songwriter Diego Torres, it was released on August 24, 1999 through Sony BMG Latin.

Track listing

Certification

References

External links
Diego Torres's official website

1999 albums
Diego Torres albums
Spanish-language albums
Albums produced by Cachorro López